Nygrenda is a village in Grimstad municipality in Agder county, Norway.

References

Villages in Agder
Grimstad